The sixth and final season of Reba, an American television sitcom series, aired on The CW from November 19, 2006 to February 18, 2007. The season consisted of 13 episodes. 

The show was broadcast during 2006–07 television season on Sundays at 7:30 pm, with repeats airing at 7:00 pm. The season averaged 3.6 million viewers.

Production 
Despite being the highest rated sitcom on the then newly formed The CW, the network decided to cancel the series after five seasons. It wasn't until June 2006 that CW reversed their decision and gave the series a final season season, but with only a 13 episode order.  

Filming for the final season began on July 27th, 2006 and concluded on October 19th, 2006.  

2 years after the show ended, the entire season was released on DVD in America and Canada on June 26th, 2009

Main Cast
 Reba McEntire as Reba Hart
 Christopher Rich as Brock Hart
 Melissa Peterman as Barbara Jean Hart
 JoAnna Garcia as Cheyenne Hart Montgomery
 Steve Howey as Van Montgomery
 Scarlett Pomers as Kyra Hart
 Mitch Holleman as Jake Hart

Episodes

Home media

References

2006 American television seasons
2007 American television seasons
Reba (TV series) seasons